Epichorista mimica is a species of moth of the family Tortricidae. It is found in New Zealand.

References

Moths described in 1930
Epichorista
Moths of New Zealand
Endemic fauna of New Zealand
Endemic moths of New Zealand